The following highways are numbered 794:

Canada
 Alberta Highway 794 (former)
Saskatchewan Highway 794

United States